Heart Solent was a local radio station owned and operated by Global Radio as part of the Heart network. It broadcast to southern and western parts of Hampshire, West Sussex, Dorset and Isle of Wight.

The station launched on 30 July 2010 as a result of a merger between Heart Hampshire (formerly Ocean Sound) and Heart Dorset & New Forest (formerly 2CR).

History

The regional station originally broadcast as two separate stations – Two Counties Radio (2CR) began broadcasting to East Dorset and West Hampshire in September 1980. Ocean Sound served South Hampshire, West Sussex and Isle of Wight from October 1986 onwards.

At first, Ocean broadcast two distinct services for the east and west of its service area with a further service for the Winchester area launching in December 1987. The West service was relaunched as Power FM (later Capital South Coast) a year later while the north and east services (The Light FM and Ocean Sound) merged in 1992.

Both 2CR and Ocean underwent various ownership changes until its current owners Global Radio rebranded the stations as Heart on 22 June 2009.

On 21 June 2010, Global Radio announced it would merge both stations as part of plans to reduce the Heart network of stations from 33 to 16. The new station began broadcasting from Segensworth, near Whiteley on Friday 30 July 2010, leading to the closure of studios in Bournemouth.

Station merger
On 26 February 2019, Global announced Heart Solent would be merged with three sister stations in Kent, Sussex & Surrey and the Thames Valley.

From 3 June 2019, local output will consist of a three-hour regional Drivetime show on weekdays, alongside localised news bulletins, traffic updates and advertising. Local breakfast and weekend shows were replaced with network programming from London.

Heart South began broadcasting regional programming from the Fareham studios on 3 June 2019.

Former presenters

Lucy Horobin (Now at Heart Dance)
Jason King (Now at Heart London)

Michael Underwood

Availability and transmitters

Analogue (FM)

Digital (DAB)

References

External links
 Heart Radio

Solent
Radio stations in Hampshire
Radio stations in Dorset
Radio stations in the Isle of Wight
Radio stations established in 2010
Defunct radio stations in the United Kingdom